Örensu is a village in the Kozluk District of Batman Province in Turkey. The village had a population of 66 in 2021.

The hamlet of Kömürlü is attached to the village.

Notable people 

 Mahmud Baksi

References 

Villages in Kozluk District
Kurdish settlements in Batman Province